Patrick Edward Rockett (born January 9, 1955) is an American former baseball shortstop who played for the Atlanta Braves between 1976 and 1978. Rockett was drafted by the Braves as the tenth pick of the 1973 amateur draft. He played his first game with the Braves on September 17, 1976, against the Los Angeles Dodgers; it was one of only four major league games he played in that season. 

Rockett played parts of two more seasons with the Braves in 1977 and 1978.  He spent the entire 1979 season with the Braves' Triple-A affiliate in Richmond before being traded in the 1979/80 off-season to the Toronto Blue Jays along with Barry Bonnell and Joey McLaughlin for Chris Chambliss and Luis Gómez. 

Rockett never played a game with the Blue Jays, spending a year with their Triple-A affiliate in Syracuse before his career came to an end.

Rockett played high school baseball at Robert E. Lee High School in San Antonio where he earned all-state honors. He was also an outstanding football player.  He helped lead the Lee Volunteers to a 28-27 1971 UIL 4A State title over Wichita Falls High School. Tommy Kramer, who had a long NFL career, was his quarterback in high school. Another notable high school teammate was Richard Osborne who also earned all-state honors and later played pro football for the Philadelphia Eagles.

References

1955 births
Living people
Atlanta Braves players
Major League Baseball shortstops
Baseball players from San Antonio
Wytheville Braves players
Greenwood Braves players
Savannah Braves players
Richmond Braves players
Syracuse Chiefs players